The 1996 Hockey East Men's Ice Hockey Tournament was the 12th tournament in the history of the conference. It was played between March 7 and March 16, 1996. Quarterfinal games were played at home team campus sites, while the final four games were, for the first time, played at the Fleet Center in Boston, Massachusetts, the home venue of the NHL's Boston Bruins. By winning the tournament, Providence received the Hockey East's automatic bid to the 1996 NCAA Division I Men's Ice Hockey Tournament.

Format
The tournament featured three rounds of play. The team that finishes ninth in the conference is not eligible for tournament play. In the first round, the first and eighth seeds, the second and seventh seeds, the third seed and sixth seeds, and the fourth seed and fifth seeds played a best-of-three with the winner advancing to the semifinals. In the semifinals, the highest and lowest seeds and second-highest and second-lowest seeds play a single elimination game, with the winners advancing to the championship game and the losers meeting in a third-place game. The tournament champion receives an automatic bid to the 1996 NCAA Division I Men's Ice Hockey Tournament.

Conference standings
Note: GP = Games played; W = Wins; L = Losses; T = Ties; SW = Shootout Wins; PTS = Points; GF = Goals For; GA = Goals Against

Bracket

Teams are reseeded after the quarterfinals

Note: * denotes overtime period(s)

Quarterfinals

(1) Boston University vs. (8) Massachusetts

(2) Massachusetts-Lowell vs. (7) Northeastern

(3) Maine vs. (6) New Hampshire

(4) Providence vs. (5) Boston College

Semifinals

(1) Boston University vs. (4) Providence

(2) Massachusetts-Lowell vs. (3) Maine

Third Place

(1) Boston University vs. (2) Massachusetts-Lowell

Championship

(3) Maine vs. (4) Providence

Tournament awards

All-Tournament Team
F Joe Hulbig* (Providence)
F Mike Ornicioli (Providence)
F Jay Pandolfo (Boston University)
D Justin Gould (Providence)
D Jeff Tory (Maine)
G Dan Dennis (Providence)
* Tournament MVP(s)

References

External links
Hockey East Online

Hockey East Men's Ice Hockey Tournament
HE tournament
Hockey East Men's Ice Hockey Tournament